Reed K. Swenson Gym (originally Wildcat Gym) is a 1,200-seat gymnasium in the western United States, on the campus of Weber State University in Ogden, Utah. It is currently the home of Weber State Wildcats women's volleyball team of the Big Sky Conference.

Built  in 1962 as Weber State's primary indoor venue, it was succeeded by the new Dee Events Center in autumn 1977. All three teams (men's and women's basketball, volleyball) moved to the Dee, leaving the gym without a varsity tenant. It was renovated in 2006 to accommodate volleyball, with its seating capacity significantly reduced. It is named for Reed Knute Swenson (1903–1989), the head basketball coach at Weber from 1933 to 1957 and longtime athletic director.

The gym hosted the inaugural Big Sky Conference men's basketball tournament in 1976; the host Wildcats lost the title game in double overtime to Boise State, with an attendance of 4,679.

The final men's basketball game was on February 12, 1977, a twelve-point win over Gonzaga before 4,941; the Bulldogs were winless in fifteen annual attempts at Wildcat Gym, but did upset Weber State by a point a week later in Spokane to foil their title hopes. Two weeks later at the conference tournament in Pocatello, the 'Cats returned the favor with a one-point win over the Zags in the semifinals.

References

External links
Weber State University Athletics: Swenson Gym

Defunct college basketball venues in the United States
Basketball venues in Utah
Weber State Wildcats basketball
Sports venues in Ogden, Utah
Sports venues completed in 1962
1962 establishments in Utah